WHLW (104.3 FM) is a radio station licensed to serve Luverne, Alabama, United States.  The station is owned by iHeartMedia, Inc. and licensed to iHM Licenses, LLC, and is one-third of the all-urban Montgomery cluster, complementing urban AC's WWMG and mainstream urban's WZHT.  The studios for the three stations are located in East Montgomery near Eastdale Mall, and WHLW has a transmitter site in Grady, Alabama.

It broadcasts an urban contemporary gospel format to the Montgomery, Alabama, market.

Notable on-air personalities currently associated with the station include Connye B, Yvette Bullard-Dillard, and Donnie McKlurkin.

History
This station received its original construction permit from the Federal Communications Commission on December 7, 1988, for a new station to serve Brantley, Alabama. The new station was assigned the call letters WDHT-FM by the FCC on May 10, 1990. On April 18, 1997, the station had its callsign changed to WMHS. After nearly nine years of extensions, modifications (including a change in community of license to Luverne, Alabama), and construction, WMHS received its license to cover from the FCC on October 29, 1997.

In November 1997, Brantley Broadcast Associates reached an agreement to sell this station to Capital Communications.  The deal was approved by the FCC on January 22, 1998, and the transaction was consummated on February 20, 1998. Concurrently, Capital Communications reached a contingent agreement to sell this station to Southern Star Communications, Inc.  The deal was also approved by the FCC on January 22, 1998, and this transaction was also consummated on February 20, 1998. On March 20, 1998, the new owners had the FCC change the station's callsign to WQLD.

On August 20, 2004, the station had its callsign changed to WNTM. The station was assigned the current WHLW call letters by the FCC on January 14, 2005.

References

External links
WHLW official website

HLW
Gospel radio stations in the United States
Crenshaw County, Alabama
Radio stations established in 1997
IHeartMedia radio stations
HLW
1997 establishments in Alabama